Gaio-Rosário e Sarilhos Pequenos is a civil parish in the municipality of Moita, Portugal. It was formed in 2013 by the merger of the former parishes of Gaio-Rosário and Sarilhos Pequenos, respectively. The population in 2011 was 2,377, in an area of 14.12 km2.

Website: http://www.uf-grsp.com/

References

Freguesias of Moita